Shesh Bahreh-ye Sofla (also Romanized as Shesh Bahreh-ye Soflá and Shesh Bahreh Soflá; also known as Shesh Bahreh Pā’īn) is a village in Milas Rural District, in the Central District of Lordegan County, Chaharmahal and Bakhtiari Province, Iran. At the 2006 census, its population was 276, in 62 families.

References 

Populated places in Lordegan County